Belper United Football Club is a football club based in Belper, Derbyshire, England.

History
A Belper United was established in the 1921. By the late 1970s the club was playing in the East Midlands Regional League. They were Division One champions in 1979–80, earning promotion to the Premier Division. In 1984–85 the club were the league's last Premier Division champions, with the league merging with the Central Alliance to form the Midlands Regional Alliance at the end of the season. Belper were placed in the Premier Division of the new league and became its inaugural champions in 1985–86. They won the league's Challenge Cup in 1992–93, before securing a second Premier Division title in 1994–95 and another Challenge Cup the following season. They were later relegated to Division One, which they won in the 2004–05 season to earn promotion back to the Premier Division.

Despite finishing bottom of the Premier Division in 2008–09, Belper were not relegated to Division One. In 2010 they switched to the South Division of the Central Midlands League. In 2014–15 they won the Central Midlands League Floodlight Cup, beating Clay Cross Town 3–2 in the final. After finishing as runners-up in the South Division in 2015–16, the club were promoted to the East Midlands Counties League. They remained members of the league until it was disbanded at the end of the 2020–21 season, at which point they were transferred to Division One of the United Counties League. In their first season in the league they finished third, qualifying for the promotion play-offs. After defeating Radford in the semi-finals, they beat Hinckley 1–0 in the final to earn promotion to the Premier Division North.

Ground
The club play at Belper Town's Christchurch Meadow. They initially moved to the ground at the start of the 2013–14 season, but later relocated to Asterdale Bowl, the home ground of Borrowash Victoria. The club returned to Christchurch Meadow at the start of the 2018–19 season.

Honours
Central Midlands League
Floodlit Cup winners 2014–15
East Midlands Regional League
Premier Division champions 1984–85
Division One champions 1979–80
Midlands Regional Alliance
Premier Division champions 1985–86, 1994–95
Division One champions 2004–05
Challenge Cup winners 1992–93, 1995–96

Records
Best FA Cup performance: Preliminary round, 2017-18
Best FA Vase performance: First round, 2014–15

References

External links
Official website

Football clubs in Derbyshire
Football clubs in England
Association football clubs established in 1921
1921 establishments in England
Belper
East Midlands Regional League
Midlands Regional Alliance
Central Midlands Football League
East Midlands Counties Football League
United Counties League